Dieter Puschel (23 June 1939 – 31 May 1992) was a German racing cyclist. He won the German National Road Race in 1962.

References

External links
 

1939 births
1992 deaths
German male cyclists
Cyclists from Berlin
German cycling road race champions
20th-century German people